In phonetics, an occlusive, sometimes known as a stop, is a consonant sound produced by occluding (i.e. blocking) airflow in the vocal tract, but not necessarily in the nasal tract. The duration of the block is the occlusion of the consonant. An occlusive may refer to one or more of the following, depending on the author:
Stops, or more precisely, oral stops—also known as plosives—are oral occlusives, where the occlusion of the vocal tract stops all airflow—oral and nasal. 
Nasals, also known as nasal stops, are nasal occlusives, where occlusion of the vocal tract shifts the airflow to the nasal tract. 
Affricates such as English ,  are partial occlusives. Typically stops and affricates are contrasted, but affricates are also described as stops with fricative release, contrasting with simple stops (= plosives). 
Implosives, in which the airstream differs from typical stops and affricates (no examples in English).
Ejectives, with yet another airstream (no examples in English).
Click consonants, such as the exclamation tsk! tsk! made when expressing reproach (often humorously) or pity, are double occlusives with yet a fourth airstream mechanism. They may be oral occlusives, nasals, affricates, or ejective. 
Oral occlusive may mean any of the above apart from nasal occlusives, but typically means stop/plosive. Nasal occlusive may be used to distinguish the simple nasal sounds from other nasal consonants.

The terms 'stop' and 'occlusive' are used inconsistently in the literature. They may be synonyms, or they may distinguish nasality as here. However, some authors use them in the opposite sense to here, with 'stop' being the generic term (oral stop, nasal stop), and 'occlusive' being restricted to oral consonants. Ladefoged and Maddieson (1996) prefer to distinguish 'stop' from 'nasal'. They say,
Note that what we call simply nasals are called nasal stops by some linguists. We avoid this phrase, preferring to reserve the term 'stop' for sounds in which there is a complete interruption of airflow.

Common occlusives
However, there are exceptions.

In fact, the labial plosive is the least stable of the voiceless stops in the languages of the world, as the unconditioned sound change  →  (→  → Ø) is quite common in unrelated languages, having occurred in the history of Classical Japanese, Classical Arabic and Proto-Celtic, for instance.

In some African and South American languages, nasal occlusives occur only in the environment of nasal vowels and so are not distinctive.

It may be more accurate to say that Hawaiian and colloquial Samoan do not distinguish velar and coronal stops than to say they lack one or the other.

Yanyuwa distinguishes nasals and plosives in 7 places of articulations /m n̪ n ṉ ɳ ŋ̟ ŋ̠/ and /b d̪ d ḏ ɖ ɡ̟ ɡ̠/ (it doesn't have voiceless plosives) which is the most out of all languages.

References 

Occlusive consonants